Rollo in Emblemland  or Emblemland is a novel by John Kendrick Bangs, written in 1902 and published by R. H. Russell of New York. It is a tale inspired by the style of Lewis Carroll's 1865 book, Alice's Adventures in Wonderland.

In it, a young boy named Rollo falls asleep and finds himself not in Wonderland, but in "Emblemland", a place described by Cupid as "the home of all Emblems.... Emblems are signs and symbols. I'm an Emblem, because I am the symbol of love; Uncle Sam is the symbol of the United States, and John Bull is the symbol of England, and the Owl is the symbol of wisdom...."

The book features line drawings by Bang's co-author Charles Raymond Macauley

In 1907, Bangs wrote a parody of Alice's Adventures in Wonderland called Alice in Blunderland: An Iridescent Dream

External links
Emblemland at Archive.org

Bibliography
Bangs, John Kendrick (2010) Rollo in Emblemland. Evertype.

Notes

1902 American novels
Books based on Alice in Wonderland
American fantasy novels
1902 fantasy novels
Doubleday, Page & Company books